Azman Ilham bin Haji Mohamed Noor (born 17 February 1984) is a Bruneian footballer who plays as a goalkeeper for Kasuka FC of the Brunei Super League.

Azman played for QAF FC and NBT FC before signing for Brunei's only professional club, DPMM FC to serve as backup to Wardun Yussof. He was loaned to the Prisons Department football team for the duration of the FIFA suspension of Brunei. He was released at the end of the 2016 season.

International career

He has played for the national team since 2006, and was called up for the 2014 AFF Suzuki Cup qualification. He was also selected for the 2014 Hassanal Bolkiah Trophy as one of the five permitted overage players.

Honours

Team
DPMM FC
 S.League: 2015
 Singapore League Cup (3): 2009, 2012, 2014
Kota Ranger FC
 Brunei FA Cup: 2018–19
 Piala Sumbangsih: 2020

External links

References

1984 births
Living people
Bruneian footballers
Brunei international footballers
Association football goalkeepers
DPMM FC players